Paramonoxenus tuberculatus is a species of beetle in the family Cerambycidae, and the only species in the genus Paramonoxenus. It was described by Stephan von Breuning in 1970.

References

Morimopsini
Beetles described in 1970